This is a list of Major District Roads in Himachal Pradesh, India.

Introduction
Himachal Pradesh State has a good road network. There are 9 National Highways with total length of 1,208 km, 19 State Highways with total length of 1,625 km and 45 Major District Roads with total length of 1753.05 km.

List of State Highways in Himachal Pradesh

References
Public Works Department, Government of Himachal Pradesh website

Roads in Himachal Pradesh
Himachal Pradesh roads
Roads
Himachal Pradesh